Shuckle may refer to:

 Shuckling – swaying during Jewish prayer
 Shuckle (Pokémon), a fictional species in the Pokémon franchise